Storm Sanders was the defending champion, but was selected to participate for Australia at the 2014 Fed Cup.

Olivia Rogowska won the tournament, defeating Irena Pavlovic in the final, 5–7, 6–4, 6–0.

Seeds

Main draw

Finals

Top half

Bottom half

References 
 Main draw

Launceston Tennis International - Singles
Launceston Tennis International
Launceston Tennis International - Singles